Dessel is a municipality located in the Belgian province of Antwerp. The municipality comprises only the town of Dessel proper. In 2021, Dessel had a total population of 9,659 inhabitants. The total area is 27.03 km².

Nuclear industries
Dessel hosts several nuclear facilities: 
 Belgoprocess, ex Eurochemic reprocessing plant (OECD), now in charge of the operational waste management for Ondraf/Niras.
 BelgoNucléaire, an old MOX factory, presently closed and to be decommissioned in the future.
 Franco-Belge de Fabrication du Combustible (FBFC) making nuclear fuel assemblies; 
 The Dessel site was selected in June 2006 by the Belgian government to construct the first shallow land disposal facility for low-level radioactive waste in Belgium. The decision was taken after consultation of the local authorities and the population in the frame of the Stola consultation group.

Sport
The town has two football clubs:
 K.F.C. Witgoor Sport, which plays in the Belgian Fourth Division.
 K.F.C. Dessel Sport, which plays in the Belgian Second Division.

Events
 Graspop Metal Meeting, yearly heavy metal festival.

Climate

Gallery

References

External links

Official website - Available only in Dutch
Eurochemic
Eurochemic 1956-1990, European Company for the Chemical Processing of Irradiated Fuels, Jean-Marc Wolff, OECD Historical Series, 1999

Municipalities of Antwerp Province
Populated places in Antwerp Province